"50% Off" is the second episode of the fifth season of the AMC television series Better Call Saul, a spin-off series of Breaking Bad. The episode aired on February 24, 2020, on AMC, in the United States. Outside of the United States, the episode premiered on the streaming service Netflix in several countries.

Plot 
Victor and Tyrus Kitt bring Nacho Varga to Gus Fring. Threatening harm to Nacho's father, Gus demands that Nacho gain the trust of Lalo Salamanca to obtain information on the Salamancas' activities. Hector Salamanca confirms for Lalo that Gus's distribution network is an essential component of the Juarez cartel's operation and profits.

Sticky and Ron, two drug users who received Jimmy McGill's 50 percent off business card, go on a multi-day binge. They purchase numerous bags of cocaine from the Salamanca stash house but the bags get stuck in the drainpipe. The police arrive just before Domingo Molina dislodges the drugs. He is arrested and the police prepare to raid the house. Nacho, aiming to gain Lalo's trust, climbs over rooftops to sneak into the house and retrieve the drug stash before police enter. Lalo is impressed with Nacho but worries Domingo may talk in jail. Still upset over Werner Ziegler's death, Mike Ehrmantraut has been regularly drinking to excess. While babysitting Kaylee Ehrmantraut, he lashes out at her when she asks for details about her father.

Kim Wexler is still apprehensive about Jimmy practicing law as Saul Goodman. Jimmy and Kim attend an open house together at Jimmy's insistence. Kim again thanks Jimmy for his effort to help her client accept the plea bargain, but says she does not want to succeed by lying.

Jimmy turns on the Saul Goodman persona at the courthouse and avoids trials while obtaining favorable plea bargains for his clients, generating fees by producing a high case turnover.  Assistant District Attorney Suzanne Ericsen, suspicious of Jimmy since Huell Babineaux's arrest, resists Saul's entreaties and insists on formally resolving their pending cases during an already-scheduled appointment. Howard invites Jimmy to lunch, and Jimmy is unsettled by the reminder of his past. Jimmy later pays a custodian, the brother of one of his clients, to disable the courthouse elevator while he is inside with Ericsen, enabling him to informally work out several favorable deals. Nacho drives up after Jimmy leaves the courthouse and coerces Jimmy into his car.

Production
The episode ties in two Easter eggs to Breaking Bad as the Better Call Saul narrative draws closer to that point, according to showrunner Peter Gould and writer Alison Tatlock. One is the origin of Domingo's "Krazy-8" nickname (ocho loco), which is revealed to have been given to him by Lalo during a poker game after Domingo fell for Lalo's bluff and folded on what would have been a winning set of 8s. The second is the introduction of Saul's Bluetooth headset, which he was seen wearing frequently during Breaking Bad.

Reception
"50% Off" received critical acclaim. On Rotten Tomatoes, it garnered a perfect 100% rating with an average score of 8.14/10 based on 15 reviews. The site's critical consensus is, 50% Off' is no bargain chapter, settling the season into Better Call Sauls familiar pace while taking big strides in coalescing the series' parallel worlds."

Ratings
"50% Off" was watched by 1.06 million viewers on its first broadcast, down from 1.60 million from the season premiere the previous night, making it the least viewed episode of the series.

Notes

References

External links
 "50% Off" at AMC
 

Better Call Saul (season 5) episodes